AEW Beach Break is an annual professional wrestling television special produced by the American promotion All Elite Wrestling (AEW). Established in 2021, the original event aired as a special episode of the promotion's flagship weekly television program, Dynamite. In 2022, it was expanded to a two-part event, with the second part airing as a special episode of Rampage. It is named after one of AEW wrestler Orange Cassidy's finishing moves, the Beach Break. The event replaced Bash at the Beach as the promotion's beach-themed event held in midwinter.

History
On March 18, 2019, Cody Rhodes, who became a wrestler and an executive vice president of All Elite Wrestling (AEW), filed to trademark several World Championship Wrestling (WCW) event names that WWE (the owner of WCW's intellectual property) had let expire, including Bash at the Beach, on the basis that Dusty Rhodes, his father, created them. Accordingly, AEW held two Bash at the Beach events in 2020. In November of that year, however, a settlement was reached between Cody Rhodes and WWE in which Cody gained the "Cody Rhodes" trademark, which WWE had held onto after his run in that company, in exchange for WWE gaining the WCW event name trademarks that Cody had claimed, including Bash at the Beach.

Two weeks after the trademark settlement was announced, AEW replaced Bash at the Beach with an event called Beach Break, named after one of AEW wrestler Orange Cassidy's finishing moves, the Beach Break. It was announced to be held as a special episode of Dynamite in January 2021. However, the event was later rescheduled to February 3. Due to the ongoing COVID-19 pandemic, the event was held at Daily's Place in Jacksonville, Florida.

On the January 5, 2022, episode of Dynamite, it was announced that a second Beach Break would take place as a two-part event at the Wolstein Center in Cleveland, Ohio on January 26. The first part aired live as Dynamite while the second part aired on tape delay as the January 28 episode of Rampage. This established Beach Break as an annual television special for AEW held in midwinter.

Events

See also
List of All Elite Wrestling special events
List of AEW Dynamite special episodes
List of AEW Rampage special episodes

References

External links

AEW Beach Break
Bash at the Beach
Recurring events established in 2021
All Elite Wrestling shows